{{DISPLAYTITLE:C19H30O2}}
The molecular formula C19H30O2 (molar mass: 290.44 g/mol, exact mass 290.22458) may refer to:

 Androstanolone
 1-Androstenediol
 4-Androstenediol
 5-Androstenediol
 Androsterone
 Cetadiol
 5α-Dihydronormethandrone
 Dihydrotestosterone
 5β-Dihydrotestosterone
 Epiandrosterone
 Epietiocholanolone
 Etiocholanolone